Höger is a surname. Due to the diacritics, it is sometimes rendered internationally as Hoeger.

People named Höger include

 Inge Höger (born 1950), German politician 
 Johann Friedrich Höger (1877–1949), German architect
 Karel Höger (1909–1977), Czechoslovakian film actor 
 Karl Höger (1897–1975), football forward 
 Marco Höger (born 1989), German footballer 
 Rudolf Alfred Höger (1877–1930), Austrian painter

People named Hoeger include

 Werner Hoeger (born 1954), US scientist

German-language surnames